Water polo in India is administered by the Swimming Federation of India. India's best performance was when they won gold at the 1951 Asian Games. The India men's national water polo team also won a silver medal at the 1970 Asian Games, losing to Japan 4 goals to 3 in the finals. The next time India won a medal was a bronze at the 1982 Asian Games.

Management 
Water Polo in India is administered by the Swimming Federation of India (SFI).

India's Men's Team at the Olympics 
India has participated twice at the Olympics.

India's Men's Team at the Asian Games 
India has participated 5 times at the Asian Games.

India's Women's Team at the Asian Games

References

External links
Swimming Federation of India